Mikalay Ryndzyuk (born 2 February 1978) is a Belarusian football coach and former player.

Football career
Mikalay Ryndzyuk started his career at Smena Minsk. He played the first season at 1994/95 at third level. After he played the first winter league in 1995, he transferred to BATE Borisov, at that time in third division. His high goal scoring rate helped BATE win promotion to top division in 1997. He then was signed by Lokomotiv Moscow in 1998.

In summer 1999, he moved back to BATE, and spent 2000 season for FC Lokomotiv Nizhny Novgorod and Kristall Smolensk.

In November 2000, he was signed by Gaziantepspor, where he signed a deal until summer 2003.

But he was away from field since November 2001, and in September 2002, he transferred to Rubin Kazan.

Honours
BATE Borisov
Belarusian Premier League champion: 1999

Dinamo Minsk
Belarusian Cup winner: 2002–03

Daugava Daugavpils
Latvian Football Cup winner: 2008

International goals

References

External links
 
 
 

1978 births
Living people
Belarusian footballers
Association football forwards
Belarus international footballers
Belarusian expatriate footballers
Expatriate footballers in Russia
Expatriate footballers in Turkey
Expatriate footballers in China
Expatriate footballers in Uzbekistan
Belarusian expatriate sportspeople in China
Belarusian expatriate sportspeople in Latvia
Russian Premier League players
Süper Lig players
China League One players
Expatriate footballers in Latvia
FC Smena Minsk players
FC BATE Borisov players
FC Lokomotiv Moscow players
FC Lokomotiv Nizhny Novgorod players
FC Kristall Smolensk players
Gaziantepspor footballers
FC Rubin Kazan players
FC Dinamo Minsk players
Pudong Zobon players
Guangzhou F.C. players
Nanjing Yoyo players
FC Daugava players
Dinaburg FC players
FC Partizan Minsk players
FC Shakhtyor Soligorsk players
FK Mash'al Mubarek players
FK Dinamo Samarqand players
FC Smorgon players
Navbahor Namangan players
Belarusian football managers
FC Smorgon managers
Footballers from Minsk